Elachista gibbera is a moth of the family Elachistidae that can be found in Russia (the Cheliabinsk district in the southern Ural Mountains).

The wingspan is 9.9–11.7 mm. The forewing ground colour is creamy white, densely suffused with dark grey tipped scales. The hindwings are grey with an ochreous grey fringe.

References

gibbera
Moths described in 2003
Endemic fauna of Russia
Moths of Europe